Hippolyte Louis Florent Bis (29 August 1789 – 3 March 1855), was an early 19th-century French playwright and librettist. He is mostly known for the libretto to Gioachino Rossini's opera William Tell (premiered in 1829), which he wrote with Étienne de Jouy.

Works

Theatre 
1817: Lothaire, tragedy in 3 acts and in verse, with François Hay
1822: Attila, five-act tragedy, Paris, Second Théâtre-Français, 26 April 
1827: Blanche d'Aquitaine, ou le Dernier des Carlovingiens, five-act tragedy, Théâtre-Français, 29 October
1845: Jeanne de Flandre, ou Régner à tout prix, tragedy, created by the Théâtre-Français at the salle Richelieu on October 29, a single performance

Opera 
1829: William Tell, four-act opera, with Étienne de Jouy, music by Rossini, Paris, Académie royale de musique, 3 August

Varia 
1822: Le Cimetière, poème lyrique
La Marseillaise du Nord, sung 6 December 1830, dans un banquet de Gardes nationaux de Lille et de Douai, après la réception des drapeaux donnés par le roi des Français Louis-Philippe Ier
Notice sur le Mal Mortier, duc de Trévise, mort assassiné près du roi, le 28 juillet 1835, suivie du programme de l'inauguration de sa statue, le 16 septembre 1838 au Catteau-Cambrésis 
1839: La Flamande, dittie in 12 couplets avec refrain, réunion des Enfants du Nord du 29 April 
1842: Le Général Guilleminot, esquisse historique

References

External links 

 Hippolyte Bis on Data.bnf.fr
 

19th-century French dramatists and playwrights
French opera librettists
Writers from Lille
1789 births
1855 deaths
Burials at Père Lachaise Cemetery